Rua do Cunha (Portuguese for Cunha Street) is a narrow pedestrian street in Vila da Taipa, the town centre of Taipa, Macau. It is wrong to say that the street is named after the Portuguese explorer Tristão da Cunha. According to the government of Macau, the street is named after Pedro Alexandrino da Cunha, a Portuguese navy captain who was the 81st governor of Macau for a few more days than a month. He arrived in Macau in 1850 and he died 37 days later from cholera, being one of the first victims of the disease in Macau. 

It is known for shops selling almond cakes, phoenix egg rolls, coconut flakes, cherikoff, and peanut candy, which travellers buy as "souvenirs", such as Choi Heong Yuen (Chinese: 咀香園) and Koi Kei (Chinese: 鉅記). It is also known for its various Portuguese restaurants, including 'O Santos', which has been in business since 1989, and 'O Galo'.

Gallery

See also
 List of restaurant districts and streets

References

Tourist attractions in Macau
Geography of Macau
Taipa
Shopping districts and streets in China
Restaurant districts and streets in China
Restaurants in Macau
Pedestrian malls in China